Grana Padano is a cheese originating in the Po river Valley in northern Italy that is similar to Parmigiano Reggiano cheese. There are less strict regulations governing its production compared to Parmigiano Reggiano. This hard, crumbly-textured cheese is made with unpasteurized cows' milk that is semi-skimmed through a natural creaming process. To preserve the authenticity of the manufacturing processes and raw materials used to make this cheese, Grana Padano is registered as Geographical Indication in Italy since 1954 and as a European Union protected designation of origin (PDO) since 1996, and is protected in several other countries based on the Lisbon Agreement and bilateral agreements.

Origin of the name
The name comes from the Italian word grana, a reference to the characteristically grainy texture, and the demonym padano, meaning "from Val Padana" (the Po valley).

History
Grana Padano was developed by monks of Chiaravalle Abbey in the 12th century. It can last a long time without spoiling, and is sometimes aged for up to two years. It is made in a similar way to the Parmigiano Reggiano of Emilia-Romagna, but over a much wider area and with different regulations and controls.

Production process
Like Parmigiano Reggiano, Grana Padano is a semi-fat hard cheese which is cooked and ripened slowly for at least nine months. If it passes quality tests, it is fire-branded with the Grana Padano trademark. The cows are milked twice a day. Milk produced in the evening is skimmed to remove the surface layer of cream and mixed with fresh milk produced in the morning. It is produced year-round, and varies seasonally as well as by year. Though similar to Parmigiano Reggiano cheese, the younger Grana Padano cheeses are less crumbly, milder and less complex in flavor than the better-known, longer-aged Parmigiano.

About 150 factories make Grana Padano in the Po Valley area, and an estimated 76,724 tons of this cheese are manufactured annually.

Specifications 
A wheel of Grana Padano is cylindrical, with slightly convex or almost straight sides and flat faces. It weighs 24 to 40 kg (53 to 88 lbs) per wheel. The rind, which is thin, is pale yellow.

Grana Padano is sold in three different ripening stages:
 "Grana Padano" (9 to 16 months): texture still creamy, only slightly grainy
 "Grana Padano oltre 16 mesi" (over 16 months): crumblier texture, more pronounced taste
 "Grana Padano Riserva" (over 20 months): grainy, crumbly and full flavoured

Grana padano cheese typically contains cheese crystals, semi-solid to gritty crystalline spots that at least partially consist of the amino acid tyrosine.

Nutritional value and calories 
1.5 litres of fresh, naturally partially-skimmed cows' milk from the production area, are needed to make 100 g of Grana Padano PDO cheese. The Grana Padano processing and ageing procedures determine an important bioavailability of vitamins and minerals, the supply of proteins with nine essential amino acids and make it a highly digestible product. In addition, Grana Padano is lactose-free due to the characteristics of its production and ageing process, which also leads to a reduction of lipids. It contains a galactose content of less than 10 mg per 100 g.

The Grana Padano PDO Production Specifications regulates the entire production chain, from the cows' fodder to the branding of the wheels, therefore the average nutritional value and calories of Grana Padano PDO cheese remain stable and any variation in them is irrelevant for the purpose of defining a balanced diet.

100 grams of Grana Padano PDO cheese contain 398 kilocalories (1,666 kJ).

Nutritional table for a medium portion of 100 grams of Grana Padano

References

Notes

Citations

External links

Official website
Video - How Grana Padano is made
Photos of the production process

Italian cheeses
Cheeses of Veneto
Cow's-milk cheeses
Italian products with protected designation of origin
Cheeses with designation of origin protected in the European Union